Loopre is a village in Põhja-Sakala Parish, Viljandi County, in central Estonia. As of 2011 Census, the settlement's population was 46.

References

Villages in Viljandi County
Kreis Fellin